Régis Juanico (born 5 February 1972) is a French politician of Génération.s who served as a member of the National Assembly of France from 2007 to 2022, representing Loire's 1st constituency. He is a former member of the Socialist Party.

Political career
Juanico was born in Saint-Rémy, Saône-et-Loire. In parliament, he serves on the Committee on European Affairs (2008–2012), the Committee on Cultural Affairs and Education (2009–2012, since 2017), the Committee on Social Affairs (2009–2011, since 2017) and the Finance Committee (2012–2017). 

In addition to his committee assignments, Juanico co-chairs the French-Spanish Parliamentary Friendship Group. He is also the co-president of the Olympic working group in the French National Assembly.

Political positions
Juanico was regarded a critic of President François Hollande. Ahead of the 2017 presidential election, he supported Benoît Hamon as the party's nominee and served as both spokesperson and treasurer of Hamon's campaign.

References

1972 births
Living people
People from Saint-Rémy, Saône-et-Loire
Socialist Party (France) politicians
Deputies of the 13th National Assembly of the French Fifth Republic
Deputies of the 14th National Assembly of the French Fifth Republic
Deputies of the 15th National Assembly of the French Fifth Republic
Politicians from Auvergne-Rhône-Alpes
Pantheon-Sorbonne University alumni
Génération.s politicians

Members of Parliament for Loire